The Great Western Railway (GWR) 1500 Class is a class of 0-6-0 pannier tank steam locomotive.  Despite being a GWR Hawksworth design, all ten (nos 1500–1509) were completed under the administration of the Western Region of British Railways in 1949, just after Nationalisation.

Overview
Coming from a railway company with a well-developed standardisation policy, the 15xx was a strange design finale. Above footplate level they were very similar to the 9400 class, and shared the same Standard no.10 boiler. The major difference was below the (very small) footplate, where they resembled the USATC S100 Class that the GWR and other railways had used during the Second World War.

Although a sound design, the class had limited usefulness as they were route-restricted by their high weight and were unsuitable for fast running because of their short wheelbase. Largely confined to empty stock workings at London Paddington station, their lives were short; for example 1509 lasted barely ten years in BR service. Four of the class, 1506 to 1509, were based in Wales, Newport Pill, Ebbw Junction & Cardiff Canton, 1508 was withdrawn from that last shed.  Like the 1600 and 9400 classes, their construction now appears to have been of doubtful value.

The onset of dieselisation and the decline in traffic on the railway network consigned the 1500s to scrap long before they were life-expired.  However 1501 has enjoyed regular use at the Severn Valley Railway in preservation for far longer than its life in BR ownership.

Preservation

1501 was one of the first of the class to be withdrawn in 1961, but was sold along with 1502 and 1509 to the National Coal Board for use at Coventry Colliery. The three locos were sent to Andrew Barclay Sons & Co., in Kilmarnock, Scotland for overhaul before delivery to the NCB. All three locomotives were purchased in 1970 by the Severn Valley Railway. Locomotives 1502 and 1509 were used as sources of spares for the restoration of 1501. The remains of 1502 and 1509 were cut up and scrapped at Cashmore's, Great Bridge in October 1970.

In 2006 No. 1501's boiler certificate expired and it was withdrawn from traffic. The locomotive was overhauled and steamed again in August 2012. It was repainted in British Railways lined black colour scheme with the early BR emblem on its tanks, a livery not normally used on shunting locomotives but carried by classmates 1501 and 1503 while at Old Oak Common.  it is out of ticket and awaiting another overhaul.

See also 
 GWR 0-6-0PT – list of classes of GWR 0-6-0 pannier tank, including table of preserved locomotives

References

External links 

 1500 Class at the Great Western Archive (+ details, shed allocations, etc.)

0-6-0PT locomotives
1500
Railway locomotives introduced in 1949
Standard gauge steam locomotives of Great Britain
Shunting locomotives